Intussusception may refer to:
 Intussusception (medical disorder)
 Intussusception (blood vessel growth)
 Rectal prolapse#Internal rectal intussusception